White Van Music is the debut studio album by American hip hop producer Jake One. It was released on Rhymesayers Entertainment on October 7, 2008. It peaked at number 10 on the Billboard Heatseekers Albums chart, number 49 on the Independent Albums chart, and number 94 on the Top R&B/Hip-Hop Albums chart.

Critical reception

At Metacritic, which assigns a weighted average score out of 100 to reviews from mainstream critics, White Van Music received an average score of 73, based on 8 reviews, indicating "generally favorable reviews".

Nate Patrin of Pitchfork gave the album a 7.6 out of 10, commenting that "the quality of the beats easily overcomes the somewhat odd novelty of hearing backpackers in close quarters with hardcore rappers, and with each listen it starts feeling more and more natural to have an all-star CD where M.O.P. and Little Brother both have hot tracks." Omar Mouallem of Exclaim! wrote, "Ultimately what it accomplishes (aside from a consistently and continuously good listen) is solidify Rhymesayers Entertainment as a serious label no longer limited to underground status."

HipHopDX included White Van Music on the "Top 25 Hip Hop Albums of 2008" list.

Jeff Weiss of LA Weekly placed "Get 'Er Done" at number 38 on the "50 Best Hip-Hop Songs of 2008" list.

Track listing

Charts

References

External links
 

2008 debut albums
Hip hop albums by American artists
Rhymesayers Entertainment albums
Albums produced by Jake One